Scene It? Twilight is a movie trivia video game developed by Screenlife Games and published by Konami for the Wii and the      
Nintendo DS. The Wii version was released in North America on November 24, 2009, and in Europe on March 19, 2010. The iPhone version was released in the United States on October 17, 2009. The game is part of the Scene It? movie trivia series.

Scene It? Twilight is a movie trivia game with questions based from the movie Twilight. Up to four players can compete in the Wii version to answer questions in the fastest time about details from the movie, while the iPhone version is limited to single player. The Wii version has received unfavorably mixed compilation scores of 53.40% and 49% on review aggregate websites GameRankings and Metacritic respectively.

Gameplay

Scene It? Twilight is a trivia game about the movie Twilight, and features no questions about New Moon even though the movie version of the book was released at the same time as the game. The game features a number of different question types, including text-based questions and questions based on movie clips. The game has two game modes: a mode which allows players to compete through four rounds of questions, or a mode which allows the players to answer a set of either 10, 20, or 30 questions to compete for a high score.

The majority of questions in the game focus on small details from the movie. Some questions use clips from the movie and then ask the players a question, while the majority of questions are found in text form, asking the player for specific details such as Edward Cullen's birth year. Questions are either asked for all participants, or one person is in the "hot seat", and is allowed the chance to answer the question by themselves before other players are allowed to buzz in and answer.

Reception
The Wii version of the game received mostly negative reviews from critics, who criticized the game's lackluster presentation and extreme difficulty; it has received compilations scores of 53.40% and 49% on review aggregate websites GameRankings and Metacritic respectively.

IGN's Levi Buchanan criticized the lack of questions about New Moon, the sequel to Twilight, noting that the film version of New Moon was released at about the same time as the release of the game. GameSpot's Sophia Tong noted that the presentation of the game was lacking, as many questions failed to use clips from the movie and instead presented questions as a "giant box of text". GamePro's Mitchell Dyer criticized the repetitive music and dull narration. IGN's Levi Buchanan praised the iPhone version of Scene It? Twilight for its low price point and large variety of questions. He questioned the large price point of the Wii version in comparison to the $5 price of the iPhone version.

References

2009 video games
IOS games
Nintendo DS games
Windows games
Works based on The Twilight Saga (film series)
Wii games
Video games about vampires
Video games developed in the United States
Twilight
Multiplayer and single-player video games